University Village may mean:

University Village, Albany, California
University Village, Chicago, Illinois
University Village, Grand Forks, North Dakota
University Village, New York
University Village, Riverside, California
University Village, Seattle, Washington
Univerzitetsko Selo (University Village), Belgrade, Serbia